I Hate Freaks Like You is the second studio album by Dee Dee Ramone, released under the name Dee Dee Ramone I.C.L.C. It was released in Europe in 1994 through World Service, a sublabel of Rough Trade Records.

German singer Nina Hagen guests on two of the album's fourteen tracks. "All's Quiet on the Eastern Front" was originally recorded by the Ramones on Pleasant Dreams (1981) and two songs were later recorded by the Ramones for ¡Adios Amigos! (1995): "I'm Making Monsters for My Friends" and "It's Not for Me to Know".

The Argentinian edition was released on Sick Boy Records in 1994 and contains the Chinese Bitch EP as bonus tracks.

Track listing

Personnel
Dee Dee Ramone - vocals, guitars
Johnny Carco - electric bass, vocals
Danny Arnold Lommen - drums, percussion

Additional musicians

Nina Hagen - vocals (13, 14)
Jan Willem Eleveld - guitar (10), lead guitar (5, 12)

References

External links 

 I Hate Freaks Like You on Discogs.com. Retrieved on 9 December 2018.

1994 albums
Dee Dee Ramone albums
Rough Trade Records albums